Hypotia bleusei is a species of snout moth in the genus Hypotia. It was described by Oberthür in 1888, and is native to Algeria and Tunisia.

References

Moths described in 1888
Hypotiini